Emily Sturge (20 April 1847 – 3 June 1892) was a British campaigner for women's education. She was secretary of the west of England branch of the National Society for Women's Suffrage.

Life
Sturge was born in 1847 in Cotham, Bristol. She was the first of eleven children born to Charlotte Allen and William Sturge. The Sturge family were prominent amongst British Quakers and related by marriage to many of the other leading Quaker families. Her siblings were Margaret, Elizabeth, William, Mary, John, Charles, Guli, Helen Maria, Clement and Caroline. Five of the Sturge daughters, including Emily, would be involved in improving the prospects for women to gain a higher education, but Emily and Elizabeth were the leading lights. Emily's own education ceased at the age of fourteen but her younger sisters were able to go on to higher education.

She was a leader in the Bristol Women's Liberal Association where she campaigned for women's rights including by electoral reform.

University College in Bristol was founded in 1876, although it was not recognised as a university until 1909. The University College arranged lectures that women including the Sturge sisters could attend.

She and Elizabeth were involved in the creation of Redland High School for Girls which opened in 1882. They both served as governors.

She was a suffragist and became secretary of the west of England branch of the National Society for Women's Suffrage in 1878 after being a member since 1872 and the society members were regular visitors at her home. The society had been formed only a few years before at Matthew Davenport Hill's house.

Sturge died in Cotham in 1892 after falling from a horse. An obituary was written by her aunt Matilda Sturge.

In 2018 blue plaques were unveiled commemorating Emily, her sister Elizabeth Sturge and Agnes Beddoe. The plaques would be on Redmaids' High School and on Redland High School even though that building is no longer a school.

References

1847 births
1892 deaths
Politicians from Bristol
British suffragists
Deaths by horse-riding accident in England
National Society for Women's Suffrage